The  is an AC electric multiple unit (EMU) train type operated on local services by Kyushu Railway Company (JR Kyushu) in Japan since 1989.

Variants
 811-0 series: 16 x 4-car sets (PM1–17)
 811-100 series: 11 x 4-car sets (PM101–111)
 811-1500 series: Refurbished 4-car sets (PM15xx)

Design
The trains were built jointly by Hitachi, Kinki Sharyo, and JR Kyushu (Kokura factory).

Operations
811 series trains are used on "Local" (all-stations) and "Rapid" (limited-stop) services on the following lines.
 Kagoshima Main Line
 Nagasaki Main Line
 Nippo Main Line

Formations
, the fleet consists of 108 vehicles, formed as 27 four-car sets.

811-0 series
The four-car 811-0 series sets (sets PM1 to PM17) are formed as follows.

The KuMoHa 810 car is fitted with one PS101Q lozenge-type pantograph. The KuHa 810 car has a toilet.

811-100 series

The four-car 811-100 series sets (sets PM101 to PM111) are formed as follows.

The KuMoHa 810 car is fitted with one PS101Q lozenge-type pantograph. The KuHa 810 car has a toilet.
Sets PM105 and PM106 have SaHa 811-200 cars instead of SaHa 811-100 cars. These also have a toilet.

811-1500 series

The four-car 811-1500 series sets (sets PM15xx) refurbished from former 811-0 series sets are formed as follows.

The KuMoHa 810 car is fitted with one single-arm pantograph. The KuHa 810 car has a toilet.

Interior
The 811-100 series sets have fixed transverse seats in the vicinity of the doorways rather than the flip-over seats of the 811-0 series sets.

Livery variations
Sets P8 and P9 carried a "Mitsui Greenland" promotional livery, and set P11 carried a "Space World" promotional livery for a while. As of January 2013, P8 carries promotional vinyls for the Kyushu Heritage Museum, and the other two sets have been returned to the standard colour scheme.

History
The first sets were delivered in June 1989, and entered service from 21 July 1989. Trains became all no-smoking from 1 September 1995.

11 811-100 series four-car sets were delivered from 1992, numbered PM101 to PM111. These had a modified seating arrangement to provide more standing space in the doorway areas.

Refurbishment

In 2017, set PM4 was refurbished, renumbered as set PM1504. Refurbishment changes include replacing the traction control equipment with SiC-VVVF equipment, changing to a single-arm pantograph, tinted passenger windows, full-colour LED destination indicators, and replacement of the former transverse seating with longitudinal bench seating. The interior and exterior design for refurbished trainsets was overseen by the industrial design company Don Design Associates. The first refurbished trainset returned to service in April 2017.

References

Electric multiple units of Japan
Kyushu Railway Company
Train-related introductions in 1989
Hitachi multiple units
Kinki Sharyo multiple units
20 kV AC multiple units